Michele Lee is an American actress, singer, dancer, producer, and director. She is known for her role as Karen Fairgate MacKenzie on the prime-time soap opera Knots Landing (1979–1993), for which she was nominated for a 1982 Emmy Award and won the Soap Opera Digest Award for Best Actress in 1988, 1991, and 1992. She was the only performer to appear in all 344 episodes of the series.

Lee began her career on Broadway in Vintage 60 (1960) and How to Succeed in Business Without Really Trying (1961). She made her movie debut in the film version of the latter in 1967. Her other film appearances include the Disney film The Love Bug (1968), The Comic (1969), and Along Came Polly (2004). She was nominated for the Tony Award for Best Actress in a Musical in 1974 for Seesaw and for the Tony Award for Best Featured Actress in a Play in 2001 for The Tale of the Allergist's Wife. She also played the title role in the 1998 TV film Scandalous Me: The Jacqueline Susann Story and Madame Morrible in the Broadway musical Wicked in 2015.

Early life
Lee was born Michele Lee Dusick in Los Angeles, California, the daughter of Sylvia Helen (née Silverstein) and Jack Dusick, a motion picture make-up artist."

Career

Career beginnings 
Her television career began at age 19, on the December 26, 1961, episode of the CBS-TV sitcom The Many Loves of Dobie Gillis.

After she sang in the film version of How to Succeed in Business Without Really Trying, she became known for her roles in the films The Comic, opposite Dick Van Dyke, and The Love Bug, opposite Dean Jones. The latter becoming the second-highest-grossing film of 1969 in the United States. That same year, she starred in a special television production of the Jerome Kern–Otto Harbach musical, Roberta, in which she sang "Smoke Gets In Your Eyes", and also peaked at #52 on the Billboard Hot 100 with "L. David Sloane". After the birth of her son, she worked infrequently until accepting a role on Broadway in Seesaw, which netted her a Tony Award nomination in 1974. After her mother's death, she stopped working to spend time with her son.

In 1974, Lee starred in the pilot episode for proposed CBS sitcom The Michele Lee Show. She played Michele Burton, a clerk in a hotel newsstand, with support from Stephen Collins. However, only the pilot episode was aired and the series did not proceed. Lee became a busy guest actor in the 1970s, appearing on Marcus Welby, M.D.; Alias Smith and Jones; Night Gallery; Love, American Style; Fantasy Island; The Love Boat; and The Match Game.

Knots Landing 
In 1979, Lee accepted the role of Karen Fairgate on Knots Landing, a spin-off of the highly popular Dallas. Though slow to start, the series eventually became a ratings hit and became one of the longest-running American primetime dramas ever, lasting for a total of 14 seasons from 1979–1993. Due to her long-running tenure, Lee's alter ego is often credited as being the center of the program. Television personality Joan Rivers commented that Lee was, in theory, the "First Lady of Knots Landing" during her guest appearance on The Late Show, which Rivers hosted at the time. The characters of the serial often represented what was happening in society at the time. Lee acknowledged that, saying: "Karen wanted to be a Pollyanna and wasn't ashamed of that. Remember in our society, maybe people don't remember, but remember when we could go over to other people's houses and come in through an open back door? I remember when I was a little girl and my mother and father would have people over and they'd walk into an unlocked door in our house." Lee was the only performer to appear in all of the show's 344 episodes.

Although Lee was enjoying a successful career on television, her marriage to actor James Farentino was failing. Farentino and she separated around the same time Lee's onscreen husband, Don Murray, left the series. Lee thus played a single mother on Knots Landing at the same time she was becoming one in real life. Lee said that when her character took off her wedding ring in a 1982 episode, she was taking off her real wedding band.

During the fall of 1982, her character met M. Patrick "Mack" MacKenzie (Kevin Dobson), who became her screen husband the following year. They would continue working together until the end of the series. Lee won the Soap Opera Digest Award for Best Lead Actress (Primetime) three times, and was also nominated for an Emmy in 1982 for "Outstanding Lead Actress in a Drama Series". In 1983, the writers/producers of Knots Landing urged her to do a storyline based on prescription drug dependency which became one of her most prominent storylines. Six years later, Lee directed her first of several episodes of the series. In 1991, Knots Landing reached a milestone with its 300th episode. During the same season, Lee filmed her favorite scene from the series, known as the "Pollyanna Speech" among fans. In this scene, for which Lee had much input, Karen reacts strongly against the social problems of 1990s society and explains how she does not want to be a Pollyanna and see the world through rose-colored glasses, but rather wanted the world to be rose-colored.

By 1992, Knots Landing had outlived all of its contemporaries, but changing audience tastes led ratings to fall. The show's budget was slashed, and to accommodate this contract cast members were asked to appear in only 15 of the season's 19 episodes. However, Lee insisted on appearing in all 19 episodes that season, doing her extra four episodes for "union scale" pay.

Later career 
After Knots Landing ended in 1993, Lee has appeared in many made-for-TV movies, including a biopic of late country star Dottie West (Big Dreams and Broken Hearts: The Dottie West Story) and she became the first woman to star in, direct, and produce a TV movie for Lifetime, Color Me Perfect (1996). She also starred in the reunion miniseries Knots Landing: Back to the Cul-de-Sac (1997), and portrayed novelist Jacqueline Susann in the television biopic Scandalous Me: The Jacqueline Susann Story (1998). In 2000, she returned to the Broadway stage in The Tale of the Allergist's Wife and received a 2001 Tony Award nomination for Best Featured Actress in a Play.

In 2004, Lee returned to feature films in the role of Ben Stiller's character's mother in Along Came Polly. She guest-starred alongside Chita Rivera in a February 2005 episode of Will & Grace. Also in 2005, she reunited with her Knots Landing co-stars for the nonfiction special Knots Landing Reunion: Together Again, in which the stars reminisced about their time on the hit series. Also in 2005, she appeared alongside Tyne Daly, Leslie Uggams, Christine Baranski and Karen Ziemba for the Kennedy Center Honor of Julie Harris. In 2010, Lee did voice work for an episode of the animated comedy series Family Guy. She returned to Broadway in 2015 to star as Madame Morrible in the musical Wicked.

Personal life
 
In 1963, Lee met actor James Farentino on the set of the play How to Succeed in Business Without Really Trying, and in 1966, they were married. They have a son, David Farentino. Lee and Farentino divorced in 1983. She married producer and writer Fred Rappaport in 1987.

Filmography

Awards and nominations

References

External links
 
 
 
 
 
 Michele Lee Online

Living people
Actresses from Los Angeles
American female dancers
American dancers
American dance musicians
American women singers
American film actresses
American musical theatre actresses
American soap opera actresses
American stage actresses
American television actresses
American television directors
Television personalities from Los Angeles
American women television personalities
Television producers from California
American women television producers
American women television directors
21st-century American women
Year of birth missing (living people)